The Malta Metro is a proposed rapid transit system for the Mediterranean island of Malta.

Background
Malta does not currently have any railways, and car ownership in Malta is exceedingly high, considering the very small size of the islands; it is the fourth-highest in the European Union.

Plans for a form of mass transit for the island of Malta were under discussion as early as 2016, with then-Minister of Transport Joe Mizzi announcing that €1.9 million of funding from the European Union had been provided to Malta to finance urban mobility plans in Valletta.

In 2021 Transport Malta unveiled a proposal for a €6.2 billion metro network, to consist of three lines and 25 stations, of which the majority would be underground. The lines would be centred on the urban area of Valletta, and the entire project was estimated to take between 15 and 20 years to complete.

Network
Three lines are proposed; a  Red Line, a  Green Line and a  Blue Line.

See also
 Transport in Malta

References

External links
 Malta Metro

Public transport in Malta
Transport in Malta